Al-Quds was an Arabic language newspaper published in Ottoman period Jerusalem between 1908 and 1914. The first issue of the paper appeared on 18 September 1908. Its publisher was Jurji Habib Hanania (1864-1920). According to the Hanania's editorial in the first issue of the newspaper on 18 September 1908 he had already applied several times for the permit to publish a newspaper starting in 1899 without success. In 1908 al-Quds was the first of many new newspapers that could be established after the Young Turk Revolution newly improvement of freedom of the press. It started with issues twice a week in four pages and printed in 1,500 copies. With the rule of Djemal Pasha freedom of the press worsened and the newspaper was eventually discontinued.

Among the authors of the published articles were Khalil al-Sakakini and Shaykh Ali Rimawi.

References

Literature

External links
 Al-Quds archives by the Columbia University Center for Palestine Studies
 Al-Quds on ⁨Jrayed - Arabic Newspaper Archive of Ottoman and Mandatory Palestine⁩ by the National Library of Israel

Newspapers established in 1908
Arabic-language newspapers
Defunct newspapers published in the Ottoman Empire
Mass media in Jerusalem
Publications disestablished in 1914
1908 establishments in the Ottoman Empire
1914 disestablishments in the Ottoman Empire